William Cummins (1874 – 27 July 1943) was an Irish Labour Party politician.

A national school teacher by profession, he was first elected to the Free State Seanad at a by-election on 21 February 1923 to fill the vacancy caused by the resignation of Eamonn Mansfield. He was re-elected for a 12-year term at the 1925 Seanad election and served until the Free State Seanad was abolished in 1936. He was elected to the 3rd Seanad Éireann in 1938 by the Labour Panel.

References

1874 births
1943 deaths
Labour Party (Ireland) senators
Members of the 1922 Seanad
Members of the 1925 Seanad
Members of the 1928 Seanad
Members of the 1931 Seanad
Members of the 1934 Seanad
Members of the 3rd Seanad
Irish schoolteachers